Kasaï is one of the 21 new provinces of the Democratic Republic of the Congo created in the 2015 repartitioning.  Kasaï and Kasaï-Central provinces are the result of the dismemberment of the former Kasaï-Occidental province.  Kasaï was formed from the Kasaï district and the independently administered city of Tshikapa which became the capital of the new province.

There are 5 administrative territories within the province, which include:

 Dekese
 Ilebo
 Kamonia (Tshikapa)
 Luebo
 Mweka

See also
 Kasai region
 Kamwina Nsapu rebellion

References

 01
Provinces of the Democratic Republic of the Congo